}

Gerardo Bönnhoff (24 June 1926 – 26 December 2013) was a German-born Argentine athlete who competed mainly in sprinting.

Born in Berlin, his family moved to Argentina when Bönnhoff was 10 years old. He excelled at the 100m and 200m, and in 1945 he became the 100m Junior South American record holder running in a time of 10.3 sec.

He competed in the 100 m, 200 m and the 4 × 100 m, at the 1948 Summer Olympics but did not get past the 2nd round in any. In 1951 he won the bronze medal at the Pan American Games held in Buenos Aires in the 4 × 100 m relay. He reached the final of the 200 m in the 1952 Summer Olympics and finished sixth.

Bönnhoff was a co-founder of the Confederación Argentina de Atletismo, (CADA).

He died on 26 December 2013 in Ciudad Jardín Lomas del Palomar, Buenos Aires.

Competition record

References

1926 births
2013 deaths
Athletes from Berlin
Argentine male sprinters
Olympic athletes of Argentina
Athletes (track and field) at the 1948 Summer Olympics
Athletes (track and field) at the 1952 Summer Olympics
Pan American Games bronze medalists for Argentina
German emigrants to Argentina
Naturalized citizens of Argentina
Pan American Games medalists in athletics (track and field)
Athletes (track and field) at the 1951 Pan American Games
Athletes (track and field) at the 1955 Pan American Games
Medalists at the 1951 Pan American Games